Feryal Ashraf Abdelaziz (born 16 February 1999) is an Egyptian karateka and the first female Egyptian to have won a gold medal at the Olympic Games. She won the gold medal in the women's +61 kg event at the 2020 Summer Olympics held in Tokyo, Japan.

Life
She was born in 1999 and when she was seven she took up karate in Cairo. In her education she studied at The British University in Egypt and trained to become a pharmacist.

She won one of the bronze medals in her event at the 2019 African Karate Championships held in Gaborone, Botswana. She represented Egypt at the African Games held in Rabat, Morocco and she won the silver medal in the women's kumite 68 kg event.

In June 2021, she qualified at the World Olympic Qualification Tournament held in Paris, France to compete at the 2020 Summer Olympics in Tokyo, Japan.

Her first match was against the Chinese Gong Li which she won 4:0. Gong Li was to progress further and take a bronze medal. Abdelaziz's second match was with Elena Quirici and she took an early lead against the Swiss opponent but Quirici levelled the score and Abdelaziz only prevailed because of senshu as she had been awarded the contest's first unopposed score. Abdelaziz then lost a match to an Iranian before a scoreless draw with Algerian Lamya Matoub allowed her to proceed to the semi-finals.

She beat Sofya Berultseva of Kazakhstan, 5:4, to claim a place in the gold medal event against Azerbaijan's Irina Zaretska. Berultseva would be guaranteed a bronze medal as peculiarly karate does not have a third place play-off match and the losing semi finalists both get a bronze medal. Abdelaziz beat her opponent in the final 2:0 to gain the gold medal and Zaretska took the silver on 7 August.

Abdelaziz and Giana Farouk were the only competitors to win a medal for Egypt in karate at the 2020 Summer Olympics. Karate will not feature in the 2024 Summer Olympics in Paris. Farouk won one of the bronze medals in the women's 61 kg event the day before. Abdelaziz was the first female Egyptian to have won a gold medal at any Olympic Games.

In November 2021, she won the gold medal in the women's team kumite event at the 2021 World Karate Championships held in Dubai, United Arab Emirates. She also competed in the women's 68 kg event.

She won the gold medal in the women's 68 kg event at the 2022 Mediterranean Games held in Oran, Algeria. In the final, she defeated Silvia Semeraro of Italy.

Achievements

References

External links 
 
 

1999 births
Living people
Egyptian female karateka
African Games medalists in karate
African Games silver medalists for Egypt
Competitors at the 2019 African Games
Karateka at the 2020 Summer Olympics
Olympic karateka of Egypt
Medalists at the 2020 Summer Olympics
Olympic medalists in karate
Olympic gold medalists for Egypt
Competitors at the 2022 Mediterranean Games
Mediterranean Games medalists in karate
Mediterranean Games gold medalists for Egypt
Sportspeople from Cairo
21st-century Egyptian women